Hong Kong Repertory Theatre is the oldest and largest professional theatre company in Hong Kong. Founded in 1977, it is registered as a non-profit organisation: some of its funding comes from the government. Among its repertoire are many well-known Chinese and international stage works. Most are performed in Cantonese. The theatre company also aims to bring new Western theatre concepts and skills to the audience.

References

External links
Official website
Hong Kong Repertory Theatre

Theatre companies in Hong Kong
Culture of Hong Kong
Entertainment companies of Hong Kong
1977 establishments in Hong Kong